Allecks Godinho Alves (born 11 March 2001) is a Brazilian footballer who plays as an  attacking midfielder.

Club career

Spartak Trnava
Allecks Godinho joined Slovak side Spartak Trnava in August 2019 and he made his Fortuna Liga debut for Trnava against Zemplín Michalovce on 7 December 2019.

References

External links
 FC Spartak Trnava official club profile 
 Futbalnet profile 
 
 

2001 births
Living people
Brazilian footballers
Brazilian expatriate footballers
Association football forwards
FC Spartak Trnava players
Slovak Super Liga players
2. Liga (Slovakia) players
Expatriate footballers in Slovakia
Brazilian expatriate sportspeople in Slovakia
Sportspeople from Tocantins